Callhistia is a genus of moths in the family Geometridae.

Species 
 Callhistia angelus (Rothschild, 1898)
 Callhistia brevipennis (Jordan & Rothschild, 1895)
 Callhistia dohertyi (Rothschild, 1897)
 Callhistia elegans (Jordan & Rothschild 1895)
 Callhistia grandis Druce, 1882
 Callhistia leucomelas (Montrouzier, [1856])
 Callhistia meforana (Rothschild, 1897)
 Callhistia wollastoni (Rothschild, 1915)

References

External links 
 Callhistia at Markku Savela's Lepidoptera and Some Other Life Forms
 The Inchworms (Lepidoptera: Geometridae) of Papua Indonesia
 Natural History Museum Lepidoptera genus database

Ennominae
Moth genera